Union Township is the name of some places in the U.S. state of Pennsylvania:

 Union Township, Adams County, Pennsylvania
 Union Township, Berks County, Pennsylvania
 Union Township, Centre County, Pennsylvania
 Union Township, Clearfield County, Pennsylvania
 Union Township, Crawford County, Pennsylvania
 Union Township, Erie County, Pennsylvania
 Union Township, Fulton County, Pennsylvania
 Union Township, Huntingdon County, Pennsylvania
 Union Township, Jefferson County, Pennsylvania
 Union Township, Lawrence County, Pennsylvania
 Union Township, Lebanon County, Pennsylvania
 Union Township, Luzerne County, Pennsylvania
 Union Township, Mifflin County, Pennsylvania
 Union Township, Schuylkill County, Pennsylvania
 Union Township, Snyder County, Pennsylvania
 Union Township, Tioga County, Pennsylvania
 Union Township, Union County, Pennsylvania
 Union Township, Washington County, Pennsylvania

See also 
 East Union Township, Schuylkill County, Pennsylvania
 North Union Township, Fayette County, Pennsylvania
 North Union Township, Schuylkill County, Pennsylvania
 South Union Township, Fayette County, Pennsylvania
 Union Township (disambiguation)

Pennsylvania township disambiguation pages